Song Cycle is the debut album by American recording artist Van Dyke Parks, released in November 1967 by Warner Bros. Records. With the exception of three cover songs, Song Cycle was written and composed by Parks, while its production was credited to Warner Bros. staff producer Lenny Waronker.

The album draws from a number of American popular music genres, including bluegrass, ragtime, and show tunes, and frames classical styles in the context of 1960s pop music.  The material utilizes unconventional song structures, and lyrically explores American history and culture, reflecting Parks' history working in both the film and music industries of Southern California.

Upon its release, Song Cycle was largely acclaimed by critics despite lukewarm sales, and later gained status as a cult album. In 2017, Song Cycle was ranked the 93rd greatest album of the 1960s by Pitchfork.

Background

In Los Angeles during the mid-1960s, Van Dyke Parks became known as an in-demand session pianist, working with such artists as The Byrds, Tim Buckley, and Paul Revere & the Raiders.  At the same time, he had been unsatisfied with contemporary pop music and its increasing submissiveness to the British invasion, going so far as to say, "apart from Pet Sounds I didn't find anything striking coming out of the United States." Wanting to give "an American experience which would be uniquely disassociable from the Beatles/British pop viewpoint," he was involved with numerous works that would indulge his interest in Depression-era American pop and folk music, such as co-writing and arranging much of Harpers Bizarre's second album Anything Goes; releasing his own singles "Come to the Sunshine", "Number Nine", and most notably providing lyrical content to the Beach Boys' album Smile.

For his collaborations with Brian Wilson, Parks was signed as a recording artist by Warner Bros. Records. The label reportedly expected that Parks could deliver a smashing commercial success on par with the Beach Boys at that time. During this epoch, Parks visited Frank Sinatra, who was dispirited by the rise of rock music, and was considering retirement. To help alleviate this, Parks pitched his brother Carson's song "Somethin' Stupid" as a duet for Sinatra and his daughter Nancy. Reportedly on Lee Hazlewood's advice, Sinatra recorded "Somethin' Stupid", and it became his first million-selling single. This bought credit for Parks at Warner Bros, and they proceeded to fund Parks's one single: an instrumental cover of Donovan's 1965 song "Colours". It was credited to "George Washington Brown"—a fictitious pianist from South America—to protect his family from the potential infamy of his "musical criminology". "Donovan's Colours" received an ecstatic two-page review by Richard Goldstein, which convinced the label of Parks's ability.

After Parks signed a solo contract with Warner Bros, he formed part of a creative circle that came to include producer Lenny Waronker and songwriter Randy Newman. Parks subsequently abandoned the Smile project, leaving the album forever unfinished by the Beach Boys.

Recording
The album's sessions cost more than US$35,000 (exceeding US$ today), making it one of the most expensive pop albums ever recorded up to that time — in 1967, the typical budget for a pop studio album was about $10,000 (US$ today). The producers were able to make early use of an eight-track professional reel-to-reel recorder, which was used to mix second generation four-track tape that had been transferred from another four-track recording for overdubs. Parks has added that the bulk of the album was done "before Sgt. Pepper reared its ugly head", and that Randy Newman had written "Vine Street" especially for him. Many Los Angeles recording facilities were used, not because of any particular sound preference, but to maximize studio time. Song Cycle contained experimental production and recording methods, including varispeed and regenerated tape delay. Audio engineer Bruce Botnick is credited for inventing the "Farkle" effect, an ingenious modification to a Sunset Sound Recorders echo box. The Farkle effect was used most prominently on violins, harps, and the intro to "The All Golden", and involved very thin splicing tape folded like a fan attached to a tape overhead.

The album opens with a recording of guitarist Steve Young performing "Black Jack Davy", a 17th-century ballad.

Release
The album had the provisional title Looney Tunes, a nod to the cartoons produced by Warner Brothers' film division. According to Parks, 

Released in November 1967, Parks later expressed that the album hadn't turned out exactly as he wanted, saying "An album with no songs was entirely unintentional," and considered the album more of a learning exercise "made with a mindset about the importance of studio exploration."

Reception

In his column for Esquire, music critic Robert Christgau felt that Song Cycle "does not rock" and had "serious reservations about [Parks'] precious, overwrought lyrics and the reedy way he sings them, but the music on this album is wonderful." Warner Bros. press sheets advertised Song Cycle as "the most important, creative and advanced pop recording since Sgt. Pepper." Although it received good reviews upon release, Song Cycle sold slowly, and took at least three years to pay for the original studio sessions. AllMusic's Jason Ankeny has described the album as

In response to the poor sales of the record after its release, Warner Bros. Records ran full page newspaper and magazine advertisements written by staff publicist Stan Cornyn that said they "lost $35,509 on 'the album of the year' (dammit)." The ad said that those who actually purchased the album had likely worn their copies out by playing it over and over, and suggested that listeners send in worn out copies to Warner Bros. in return for two new copies, including one "to educate a friend with." Incensed by the tactic, Parks accused Cornyn of trying to kill his career. Excerpts from positive reviews were reprinted in these ads, which included statements written by the Los Angeles Free Press ("The most important art rock project"), Rolling Stone ("Van Dyke Parks may come to be considered the Gertrude Stein of the new pop music"), and The Hollywood Reporter ("Very esoteric").

Many musicians cite the album as an influence, including producer and songwriter Jim O'Rourke. O'Rourke worked with Parks and harpist Joanna Newsom on Newsom's record Ys.  Joanna Newsom sought out the partnership with Van Dyke Parks after listening to Song Cycle.

Track listing

Notes
"Van Dyke Parks" (credited as 'public domain') is actually an interpretation of "Nearer, My God, to Thee", "accompanied by the sound of rushing water".

Personnel
 Van Dyke Parks – main performer, vocals
Additional musicians and production staff

 Lenny Waronker – producer
 Ron Elliott, Dick Rosmini – guitar
 Misha Goodatieff – violin
 Virginia Majewski – viola
 Carl Fortina – accordion
 Nicolai Bolin, Vasil Crlenica, William Nadel, Allan Reuss, Leon Stewart, Tommy Tedesco – balalaika
 Don Bagley, Gregory Bemko, Chuck Berghofer, Harry Bluestone, Samuel Boghossian, Dennis Budimir, Joseph Ditullio, Jesse Ehrlich, Nathan Gershman, Philip Goldberg, Armand Kaproff, William Kurasch, Leonard Malarsky, Jerome Reisler, Red Rhodes, Trefoni Rizzi, Lyle Ritz, Joseph Saxon, Ralph Schaffer, Leonard Selic, Frederick Seykora, Darrel Terwilliger, Bob West – strings
 Gayle Levant – harp
 Norman Benno, Arthur Briegleb, Vincent DeRosa, George Fields, William Green, Jim Horn, Dick Hyde, Jay Migliori, Tommy Morgan, Ted Nash, Richard Perissi, Thomas Scott, Thomas Shepard – woodwind
 Billie J. Barnum, Gerri Engeman, Karen Gunderson, James and Vanessa Hendricks, Durrie and Gaile Parks, Julia E. Rinker, Paul Jay Robbins, Nik Woods – choir
 Hal Blaine, Gary Coleman, Jim Gordon, Earl Palmer – percussion
 Steve Young – folk ("Vine Street" introduction tape)

References

Bibliography

External links
33 blog page: "Van Dyke Parks – Song Cycle, by Richard Henderson.

1967 debut albums
Warner Records albums
Van Dyke Parks albums
Albums produced by Lenny Waronker
Concept albums
Avant-pop albums
Baroque pop albums
Art rock albums by American artists